In mathematics, specifically in spectral theory, a discrete spectrum of a closed linear operator is defined as the set of isolated points of its spectrum such that the rank of the corresponding Riesz projector is finite.

Definition
A point 
in the spectrum  of a closed linear operator  in the Banach space  with domain  is said to belong to discrete spectrum  of  if the following two conditions are satisfied:
 The rank of the corresponding Riesz projector  is finite.

Relation to normal eigenvalues

The discrete spectrum  coincides with the set of normal eigenvalues of :

Relation to isolated eigenvalues of finite algebraic multiplicity

In general, the rank of the Riesz projector can be larger than the dimension of the root lineal  of the corresponding eigenvalue, and in particular it is possible to have , . So, there is the following inclusion:

In particular, for a quasinilpotent operator

one has
,
.

Relation to the point spectrum

While each point of the discrete spectrum belongs to the point spectrum,

the converse is not necessarily true: the point spectrum does not necessarily consist of isolated points of the spectrum, as one can see from the example of the left shift operator,

For this operator, the point spectrum is the unit disc of the complex plane, the spectrum is the closure of the unit disc, while the discrete spectrum is empty:

See also
 Spectrum (functional analysis)
 Decomposition of spectrum (functional analysis)
 Normal eigenvalue
 Essential spectrum
 Spectrum of an operator
 Resolvent formalism
 Riesz projector
 Fredholm operator
 Operator theory

References

Spectral theory